Jacobo Reyes Murillo (born August 11, 2000) is an American professional soccer player who plays as a winger for Liga de Expansión MX club Raya2, on loan from Monterrey.

Club career
Reyes started his career with Mexican top flight side Monterrey. In 2019, he joined the Portland Pilots in the United States. Before the second half of 2019–20, he returned to Mexican top flight club Monterrey. On October 24, 2021, Reyes debuted for Monterrey during a 0-1 loss to Necaxa.

International career
He represented United States at the 2017 FIFA U-17 World Cup.

Career statistics

Club

References

External links
 

2000 births
Living people
American soccer players
Mexican footballers
Association football forwards
C.F. Monterrey players
Liga MX players
Raya2 Expansión players